Melmangalam is a village in the Andipatti block revenue block of Theni district, Tamil Nadu, India.

Demographics 

As per the 2010 census, Melmangalam had a total population of 4689 with 2386 males and 2303 females. Out of the total population, 2784 people were literate.

References

Villages in Theni district